Sulla coronaria (French honeysuckle, cock's head, Italian sainfoin, sulla, or soola) is a perennial herb native to Malta, Algeria, Morocco, Tunisia, southern Italy and Spain, cultivated for animal fodder and hay, and for honey production.

The plant is deep-rooted and drought-resistant, growing to 1–1.5 m tall with leaves imparipinnate with 7–11 leaflets. Flowers are red, with the standard 12–15 mm long; fruits are jointed and made of 2–4 spinulose articles. Pods have a yellow thorny surface that turns brown at maturity.

References 

 Aluka entry
 FAO Animal feed Resources Information System

External links 

Hedysareae
Plants described in 1753
Taxa named by Carl Linnaeus